The Jersey women's cricket team is the team that represents the Crown dependency of Jersey in international women's cricket matches. They became an affiliate member of the International Cricket Council (ICC) in 2005, and an associate member in 2007.

In April 2018, the ICC granted full Women's Twenty20 International (WT20I) status to all its members. Therefore, all Twenty20 matches played between Jersey women and another international side after 1 July 2018 will be a full WT20I. Their first game was against Guernsey on 31 May 2019; Jersey fielded seven players under the age of 15.

In 2023, it was announced Jersey would participate in the qualifying process for the ICC Women's T20 World Cup for the first time, by hosting the Europe Division Two qualifier for the 2024 ICC Women's T20 World Cup.

Development

Jersey Cricket requires increased participation and therefore performance from its teams. In order to achieve this, it continues to develop a sustainable structure that will provide cricket opportunities for all. To meet the needs of its growing player base, Jersey is in need of more trained coaches, umpires, scorers and administrators.

Jersey has put a high priority on developing women's cricket from grass root level to the senior national side. Hiring of Gemma Dunning as female development coach, courtesy  Regional funding support in Jersey,  has increased participation numbers in the girls' and women's game. Jersey is working closely with Hampshire CCC and the Guernsey Cricket Board in order to offer competitive and fun playing opportunities across all age groups.

Records and statistics
International Match Summary — Jersey Women
 
Last updated 25 June 2022

Twenty20 International 

 Highest team total: 175/4 v Spain on 6 May 2022 at Dreux Sport Cricket Club, Dreux.
 Highest individual score: 59*, Trinity Smith v Spain on 6 May 2022 at Dreux Sport Cricket Club, Dreux.
 Best individual bowling figures: 4/16, Rosa Hill v Norway on 3 August 2019 at Parc du Grand Blottereau, Nantes.

T20I record versus other nations

Records complete to WT20I #1151. Last updated 25 June 2022.

See also
 List of Jersey women Twenty20 International cricketers

References

External links
 Official Website
 FemaleCricket-Jersey
 Cricinfo Jersey

Cricket in Jersey
Women's national cricket teams
Cricket
Jersey in international cricket
Women's sport in Jersey